Chanston James "Chansey" Paech (born 1987) is an Australian politician. He is a Labor Party member of the Northern Territory Legislative Assembly since 2016, representing the electorate of Namatjira until 2020 and Electoral division of Gwoja thereafter. He is of Arrente, Arabana and Gurindji descent.

Early years and background 
Paech was born in Alice Springs. His mother is of Arrernte, Arabana and Gurindji descent, First Nations groups from within the Interior of the Australian continent. His father, South Australian born of German heritage whose family connections are traced back to the settling of the Adelaide Hills namely the region of Hahndorf.

He is the great-great grandson of Central Australian pioneer Topsy Smith and the great-great nephew of legendary bushman Walter Smith. Paech is the only openly gay male MP in the NT Legislative Assembly and before entering politics, he was a prominent LGBT rights activist.

Paech was educated in Alice Springs, Northern Territory and participated in many youth programs including the inaugural National Indigenous Youth Parliament. He went on to study at Charles Darwin University in the fields of Land Management, Conservation and Horticulture.

Paech was elected to the Alice Springs Town Council in 2012. 

Paech has condemned the Northern Territory Emergency Response (NTER) or commonly known as the Intervention and Stronger Futures and has condemned race-based policy.

Territory Policies 
Justice 

Paech was sworn in as the Northern Territory Attorney General in May 2022 and committed to overhauling the Northern Territory's Justice and Correctional systems, in October 2022 Paech introduced a suite of laws raising the age of criminal responsibility and reforming adult mandatory sentencing 

Paech also introduced a suite of amendments to the Northern Territory's anti-discrimination laws making the Northern Territory's anti-discrimination laws Nation leading at the time in terms of protections for vulnerable people and minority groups. 

In February 2022, Paech, having responsibility for the Northern Territory's sacred sites legislation, tabled a decision in Northern Territory parliament to reject an application to expand the controversial McArthur River mine.

Housing 

In the Gunner Ministry Paech was sworn in as the Minister for Remote Housing, Homelands and Town Camps. He opposed the then Commonweath government the Morrison Government for failures to deliver remote housing on homelands and town camps a position which was also supported by Selena Uibo, the succeeding Minister for Housing in the Northern Territory.

Politics

|}
Paech was preselected as the Labor candidate for Namatjira for the 2016 Territory election.  The seat's incumbent since 2005 (dating to when the seat was known as MacDonnell), independent Alison Anderson, was retiring after three terms.  On paper, Paech faced daunting odds. The seat had a notional Country Liberal Party majority of 20.8 percent, and a redistribution had seemingly consolidated the CLP's hold on the seat by pushing it into Alice Springs. However, Anderson, who had served under four banners during her tenure (Labor, CLP, independent, Palmer United and independent again) endorsed Paech as her successor; she is a longtime indigenous activist, and retained substantial goodwill in the area.  The ABC's Antony Green believed that Anderson's endorsement made Namatjira "a certain Labor gain."

Paech won the seat resoundingly, taking 59 percent of the two-party vote on a swing of over 29 percent, the second-largest swing of the election—enough to revert Namatjira to its traditional status as a safe Labor seat. He was subsequently made Deputy Speaker and Chairman of Committees.

Paech is the first openly gay indigenous MP in Australia.  He gave his maiden parliamentary speech on 19 October 2016, in which he said he entered the chamber "eternally proud of who I am and where I come from ... I am young, I am gay, I am black; a true-blue Territorian. I am a proud face of the diversity and future of the great Australian Labor party."  He added: "I look forward to the day when this country will recognise my rights as equal rights, when I too can marry in my country, on my country, as a recognised first Australian."

In June 2020, Paech was elected Speaker of the Northern Territory Legislative Assembly, making him Australians first Aboriginal and openly gay speaker of an Australian Parliament  replacing Kezia Purick who resigned after findings of corrupt conduct against her by the Northern Territory Independent Commissioner Against Corruption.  He won the new seat of Gwoja at the 2020 Territory election. He resigned as Speaker in September 2020 to join the Gunner Ministry as Minister for Local Government; Minister for Central Australia Economic Reconstruction; Minister for Remote Housing and Town Camps; Minister for Indigenous Essential Services; and Minister for Arts and Culture.

In May 2022, Paech was sworn in as the Northern Territory Attorney General; Leader of Government Business; Minister for Racing, Gaming and Licensing; Minister for Arts and Culture and Minister for Local Government in the Fyles Ministry.  

Paech is a member of the Labor Party Left faction.

References

Living people
Members of the Northern Territory Legislative Assembly
Speakers of the Northern Territory Legislative Assembly
Australian Labor Party members of the Northern Territory Legislative Assembly
Indigenous Australian politicians
Gay politicians
LGBT legislators in Australia
21st-century Australian politicians
Charles Darwin University alumni
1987 births